The 1979 WTA German Open was a women's tennis tournament played on outdoor clay courts at the Rot-Weiss Tennis Club in West Berlin, West Germany that was part of the 1979 Colgate Series and was held from 21 May through 27 May 1979. It was the 11th edition of the tournament and the first women's only edition.  Caroline Stoll won the singles title and earned $20,000 first-prize money.

Finals

Singles
 Caroline Stoll defeated  Regina Maršíková 7–6(7–4), 6–0

Doubles
 Rosie Casals /  Wendy Turnbull defeated  Evonne Goolagong /  Kerry Reid 6–2, 7–5

Prize money

Notes

References

German Open
WTA German Open
WTA